Pure Theory of Law is a book by legal theorist Hans Kelsen, first published in 1934 and in a greatly expanded "second edition" (effectively a new book) in 1960. The second edition appeared in English translation in 1967, as Pure Theory of Law, the first edition in English translation in 1992, as Introduction to the Problems of Legal Theory. The theory proposed in this book has probably been the most influential theory of law produced during the 20th century. It is, at the least, one of the high points of modernist legal theory.

Editions
The two editions of Kelsen's book were separated by twenty-six years, and the second edition (1960) was almost twice the length of the first in the detail of its presentation. The original terminology which was introduced in the first edition was already present in many of Kelsen's writings from the 1920s, and were also subject to discussion in the critical press of that decade as well, before it was first published in 1934. Although the second edition was significantly longer, the two editions had a great deal of similarity of content, and much of the material covered in the volumes is consistent not only with one another, but also with many of Kelsen's previous writings from the 1910s and 1920s. The following sections herein shall follow Kelsen's own preference for the presentation of his main topics of the pure theory of law as he presented them in the second edition of this book.

Chapters

I. Law and Nature
In the first paragraph of Pure Theory of Law, Kelsen introduces his theory as being a theory of positive law. This theory of positive law is then presented by Kelsen as forming a hierarchy of laws which start from a basic norm (Grundnorm) where all other norms are related to each other by either being inferior norms, when the one is compared to the other, or superior norms. The interaction of these norms is then further subject to representation as a static theory of law (Kelsen's chapter 4) or as a dynamic theory of law (Kelsen's chapter 5).

II. Law and Morals
Kelsen's strict separation of law and morality, in Chapter Two of Pure Theory of Law, was an integral part of his presentation of the Pure Theory of Law. The application of the law, in order to be protected from moral influence or political influence, needed to be safeguarded by its separation from the sphere of conventional moral influence or political influence. Kelsen did not deny that moral discussion was still possible and even to be encouraged in the sociological domain of intersubjective activity. However, the Pure Theory of Law was not to be subject to such influences.

III. Law and Science
In Chapter Three of Pure Theory of Law, law is defined as the application of norms to its functions within the delineations of a science of law. Science was generally the domain of the causal understanding of epistemological data and its primary logical and causally oriented technique was to be distinguished from the normative reasoning as was to be found in the Pure Theory of Law. Therefore, the legal sciences were to be normatively based in distinction from the physical sciences which were to be causally based.

IV. The Static Aspect of Law
In Chapter Four, Kelsen distinguishes the static theory of law from the dynamic theory of law. The static theory of law represents the law as a hierarchy of laws where the individual laws are related as being either superior or inferior the one to the other. This hierarchical theory was largely adopted from Adolf Merkl's research in the structural aspects of the law while Kelsen was still in Vienna. At nearly one hundred pages each, Kelsen's chapters on the static aspect of law and the dynamic aspect of law are the most extensively developed sections of this book.

V. The Dynamic Aspect of Law
In Chapter Five of Pure Theory of Law, sections 34 and 35, Kelsen discusses the dynamic theory of law. In the dynamic theory of law, the static theory of law comes into direct contact with the governmental administration of the state which must recognize the function of the legislature in the writing of new law. At the same time there is also the understanding of law as being affected by the accumulated standing law which represents the decisions of the courts which in principle become part of the hierarchical representation of the Pure Theory of Law. Importantly, Kelsen allows for the legislative process to recognize the law as the product of political and ethical debate which is the product of the activity of the legislature before it becomes part of the domain of the static theory of law. At nearly one hundred pages in length, this chapter on the dynamic aspect of law is the longest and most fully developed chapter in this book other than the chapter on the static aspect of law.

VI. Law and State
Chapter Six of Pure Theory of Law has Kelsen present his celebrated identity theory of law and state. This is Kelsen's highly functional theory of the state and the law as representing the same entity. It is not to be confused with the sociological domain or the cultural domain of intersubjective activity. Nor is it to be confused with the political or even the religious domain of intersubjective interaction among individuals.

VII. State and International Law
In Chapter Seven, Kelsen discusses the interaction of state law and international law as these are especially guided by the understanding of political sovereignty. For Kelsen, the assessment of international law is that it represents a very primitive form of law in distinct contrast to the highly developed forms of law as may be found in individual nations and states. As a result, Kelsen emphasizes that international law is often prone to the conduct of war and severe diplomatic measures (blockade, seizure, internment, etc.) as offering the only corrective measures available to it in regulating the conduct between nations. To him, international law is formed in war and reprisals. For Kelsen, this is largely inevitable due to the relative primitiveness of international law in contemporary society.

VIII. Interpretation
Kelsen's final chapter, Chapter Eight, deals with the subject of interpretation in at least three of its most important aspects. First, Kelsen discusses the nature and methodology of the interpretation of the law. Second, he discusses interpretation as an act of cognition and of voluntary will. Third, he discusses interpretation as it is to be understood as part of the science of law, as Kelsen has defined it as being 'purified' from the undue influences of politics, morals, and metaphysics.

Supportive and supplementary commentary
Kelsen attempted to reconstruct 'legal science (Rechtswissenschaft)' as a 'science of norms (Normen)', on analogy with Immanuel Kant's conception of a science of 'causality' as used in natural science (Hans Kelsen, Society and Nature, 1946, pages 249-262, Kegan Paul Press). This type of legal science would be 'pure' in two senses as described below.

Defining 'purity' of legal science
Firstly, it would be 'pure' in a sense analogous to that in Kant's Metaphysical Foundations of Natural Science. It would set out a priori a 'pure part' of legal science, consisting of a framework of fundamental concepts. Then, in an empirical part of legal science, this framework would be applied to empirical (sociological, historical and so on) material so as to understand that material as 'law'.

The science, in both of its parts, would also be 'pure' in a second sense, in being solely descriptive—excluding from the science any element of evaluation. The core subject matter of legal science, for Kelsen, is legal norms. He defines a 'norm' as 'the meaning of an act of will'. Thus, for Kelsen a norm does not necessarily have any element of generality—hence not all norms are rules. Indeed, as the meaning of an act of will, a norm is not intrinsically rational; departing from Kant both back toward David Hume as well as in the direction of contemporary philosophical positivism, Kelsen denies the existence of practical reason.

Legal science, as Kelsen would like it to be, has to describe a legal norm without either evaluating it or adopting it as an evaluation. This can be done by distinguishing rigorously between the social statement that is the norm itself and the legal-scientific restatement of it that is, or is contained in, a description of the norm. Kelsen terms the norm itself a 'legal norm (Rechtsnorm)' and its descriptive restatement a 'legal proposition (Rechtssatz)'.

Legal orders
For Kelsen as for other central European contemporaries, norms occur not singly but in sets, termed 'orders'. The ordering principle of an order of moral norms—and of an order of natural law, if one could exist—would be logical, as deduction. From the general norm 'do not kill other human beings', it follows deductively that A must not kill any other human being. Kelsen calls this a 'static' order. An order of positive law, he maintains, is not, or not centrally, like that. Although it forms a hierarchy, it is 'dynamic', in that its ordering principle is authorisation. Each relatively 'higher' norm authorises someone (an individual or an organ, primarily of the state) to create further and relatively 'lower' norms. In this is found the specific characteristic of positive law, hence of all law, that it regulates its own creation. Even though positive legal norms do commonly contain elements of generality, those elements are not central to the relation between a higher and a lower norm. This is a relation of legal 'validity' (not to be confused with logical validity), which is that the creation of the lower norm has been authorised by the higher norm. Since this moment of creation always involves extraneous considerations, Kelsen does not need to supplement his model with a concept of 'discretion'.

What has to be consistent in a dynamic order of norms is only the process of authorising. This process can (and perhaps always does) result in multiple and mutually uneven strands of hierarchy, such as legislative, executive and judicial strands. In each strand, at every point in the process of norm-creation, many types of extra-legal factor may be taken into account—moral, political, economic and others. Kelsen notes that, in this respect, the Pure Theory of Law has an affinity with American 'legal realism'.

At the same time, the 'hierarchy' model does not readily fit a common-law system. It takes as its paradigm a single constitutional document under which codes and statutes are enacted, with both administration and adjudication in subordinate places. However, at least outside the United States, common-law systems are moving in the direction of that paradigm. The 'hierarchy' model also fits public law more readily than private law. It is difficult to be convinced by Kelsen's contention that, in private transactions, the parties are exercising legal authorisation.

Basic norm (Grundnorm)
Kelsen assumes, however, that the scientific representation of a positive-legal order, as a hierarchy of legal propositions, must have a guarantor of unity. This guarantor cannot be other than a component of the representation, hence a legal proposition. Being a legal proposition, it counts as a representation of an actual norm. So Kelsen calls it, elliptically, a 'basic norm (Grundnorm)'.

Notes

Sources

Further reading

Selected works by Kelsen
Reine Rechtslehre, Vienna 1934.
Introduction to the Problems of Legal Theory (1934; Litschewski Paulson and Paulson trans.), Oxford 1992; the translators have adopted the subtitle of the first edition, Einleitung in die rechtswissenschaftliche Problematik, in order to avoid confusion with the English translation of the second edition.
'On the Theory of Interpretation' (1934; Litschewski Paulson and Paulson trans.) (1990) 10 Legal Studies 127.
Law and Peace in International Relations, Cambridge (Mass.) 1942, Union (N.J.) 1997.
Peace Through Law, Chapel Hill 1944, Union (N.J.) 2000.
Reine Rechtslehre, Vienna 1960, "2nd edn" although a different work; amended, Tübingen 2017.
Pure Theory of Law (1960; Knight trans.), Berkeley 1967, Union (N.J.) 2002.
Théorie pure du droit (1960; Eisenmann trans.), Paris 1962.
General Theory of Law and State (German original not published; Wedberg trans.), 1945, New York 1961, Clark (N.J.) 2007.
What is Justice?, Berkeley 1957.
'The Function of a Constitution' (1964; Stewart trans.) in Richard Tur and William Twining (eds), Essays on Kelsen, Oxford 1986; also in 5th and later editions of Lloyd's Introduction to Jurisprudence, London (currently 8th ed 2008).
Essays in Legal and Moral Philosophy (Weinberger sel., Heath trans.), Dordrecht 1973.
Allgemeine Theorie der Normen (ed. Ringhofer and Walter), Vienna 1979.
General Theory of Norms (1979; Hartney trans.), Oxford 1990.

Selected works in English on Kelsen
Uta Bindreiter, Why Grundnorm? A Treatise on the Implications of Kelsen's Doctrine, The Hague 2002.
William Ebenstein, The Pure Theory of Law, 1945; New York 1969.
Ronald Moore, Legal Norms and Legal Science: a Critical Study of Hans Kelsen's Pure Theory of Law, Honolulu 1978.
Stanley L. Paulson and Bonnie Litschewski Paulson (eds), Normativity and Norms: Critical Perspectives on Kelsenian Themes, Oxford 1998.
Iain Stewart, 'The Critical Legal Science of Hans Kelsen' (1990) 17 Journal of Law and Society 273.
Richard Tur and William Twining (eds), Essays on Kelsen, Oxford 1986.
Lars Vinx, Hans Kelsen's Pure Theory of Law, Oxford 2007.

External links 
 'The Pure Theory of Law', Stanford Encyclopedia of Philosophy.

1934 non-fiction books
Books about jurisprudence